Close House Mine  is a Site of Special Scientific Interest in the Teesdale district of west County Durham, England. It is a working opencast mine located in Arngill Beck on the north-east flank of Close House Crags, in the Lunedale Forest. The site is surrounded on three sides by the Upper Teesdale SSSI.

The mine is situated within the Lunedale fault system, at the southern limit of the Alston Block. A large barite ore body is exposed at the mine and a rare mineral, rosasite, has been identified at the site.

References

Sites of Special Scientific Interest in County Durham
Mines in County Durham